Kim Nam-gil is a South Korean actor, producer, director, singer and philanthropist. He is best known from leading roles in disaster blockbuster Pandora (2016); crime thriller Memoir of a Murderer  (2017); adventure film The Pirates (2014); period drama  Portrait of a Beauty (2008) and the crime-comedy television drama The Fiery Priest (2019). His breakthrough role was Bidam in the hit television period drama Queen Seondeok (2009).

Kim is also the founder and CEO of a non-profit organization Gilstory that focuses on preserving cultural heritage, promoting arts and raising special purpose relief funds. Kim is known for his versatility as an actor and for often balancing projects with commercial value and roles that are artistic in nature. He was placed 17th in the top 40 most powerful stars in Korea 2020 by Forbes. On February 3, 2021, Kim launched Gilstory ENT, a comprehensive entertainment company, together with Han Jae Deok, head of film production company Sanai Pictures.

Career

Television 

Kim began his acting career on television with a minor role in the 1999 KBS youth drama School 1. Four years later, he passed the 2003 Talent Audition conducted annually by MBC, and appeared in various minor roles on the network's shows, such as Be Strong, Geum-soon!. During this time, he was using the stage name Lee Han, which he made up to avoid confusion with Kang Nam-gil, another Korean actor with a similar name, and to give himself a more sophisticated image. In the following years he took on more supporting roles in television dramas, among them Goodbye Solo, Lovers, and When Spring Comes.

In 2009, Kim was cast as one of the supporting characters in the historical drama Queen Seondeok, in a role that would soon change his life. It became one of the highest-rated TV series of that year (reaching a peak of over 40%), and Kim became a household name and the series' breakout star. For his portrayal of the playful but tragic Bidam, Kim said he was inspired by comic book characters such as Han Bi-kwang in Ruler of the Land, Miyamoto Musashi in Vagabond, and Kang Baek-ho in Slam Dunk. The writers rewrote the script to respond to Bidam's popularity with the viewing audience, giving the character more screen time and emphasizing his romance with the titular Seondeok (despite the incredible historical inaccuracy), until there were two main male leads in the series. A horse-riding-related injury on set, and a brief hospitalization due to H1N1 flu, were minor negatives compared to the impact the series had on Kim's career. He won several awards for his performance, gained more local and international fans, received advertisement offers, and was flooded with film and TV scripts.

In 2010 he played an antihero lead role in Bad Guy, a dark melodrama about revenge, ambition, and fatal love. But while still in the middle of filming, Kim received his draft notice for mandatory military service. He tried to ask for deferment in order to wrap up the shoot for the series, but it was not granted. Kim shot as much as he could (his scenes were reduced, and a body double was also used) then entered the army two days later on July 15, 2010. He received four weeks of basic training at Nonsan, and served for two years as a public service worker.

In 2013 Kim starred in the revenge TV series Shark (also known as Don't Look Back), from the makers of Resurrection and The Devil.

In 2017 he starred in the time-slip medical drama Live Up to Your Name. In 2019 he headlined the comedy crime drama The Fiery Priest as a hot tempered priest. It was the first drama to air on Fridays and Saturdays on SBS and was well received by viewers, seeing a rapid rise in ratings and ending at a peak of 22%. Kim earned a Best Actor nomination at the 55th Baeksang Arts Awards, and went on to win eight awards for his performance including the Grand Prize (Daesang) at the 2019 SBS Drama Awards.

In 2022, Kim returned to the small screen with the SBS drama Through the Darkness as a criminal behavior analyst, which was his return to terrestrial television in three years, excluding Kim as a special appearance in the drama, SBS's One the Woman in which he appeared to support one of his previous co-star Lee Ha-nee.

Film 
Kim debuted on the big-screen in 2004 gangster movie Low life. In 2006, he made the bold decision to portray a homosexual character in the controversial queer indie No Regret in a role which included several gay sex scenes. The film was critically praised and traveled the film festival circuit, being shown among others in the Panorama section of the 57th Berlin Film Festival. He was then cast in 2008's Public Enemy Returns, where he worked with the actor Jung Jae-young. Kim had stated in interviews that Jung Jae-young, who attended the same high school he did, had been his role model as an actor. Upon the influence of the film's director Kang Woo-suk (but against the advice of his agent and manager), Kim stopped using the stage name Lee Han and reverted to his birth name. Later that year, he played his first leading role in a major commercial film, Portrait of a Beauty. Though his co-star Kim Min-sun garnered most of the attention for the erotic costume drama, Kim's strong performance did not go unnoticed.

Another side benefit of Kim's popularity resulting from the Seondeok was the theatrical release in 2010 of his indie Lovers Vanished, a relationship drama which the director described as a "Korean Leaving Las Vegas."

Following his discharge from the army in 2012, Kim produced the film Ensemble, a music mockumentary about a group of classical musicians who form a group and take to the streets to perform outside their usual concert halls, showing their youthful passion in making music accessible. It premiered at the Jecheon International Music & Film Festival.  He was also one of four celebrities in 2013 who directed a short film using smartphone Samsung Galaxy S4 with the theme "Meet a Life Companion"; his short Hello, Mom depicted the love between a mother and her daughter, and evoked the warm feeling of an analog film. This was followed by the 2014 period adventure film The Pirates, which reunited him with Shark costar Son Ye-jin.

He next starred opposite award-winning actress Jeon Do-yeon in the 2015 thriller The Shameless; Kim played a detective who falls for the girlfriend of the murderer he is investigating. The Shameless had its world premiere at 2015 Cannes Film Festival in the Un Certain Regard section. Nam Gil was next cast as powerful nobleman Heungseon Daewongun whose concubine takes up pansori in the period film The Sound of a Flower.

In 2016 Kim starred in disaster blockbuster Pandora portraying the aftermath of an explosion in a nuclear plant. Pandora premiered internationally at the International Film Festival and Awards Macao,  receiving standing ovation.

In 2017 Kim starred in the action thriller Memoir of a Murderer and romance drama film One Day. In 2019, Kim starred in the comedy film The Odd Family: Zombie On Sale.

In 2020, Kim starred in the horror film The Closet.

Other
In 2012, Kim published a book titled Way Back to the Road, his memoir of the previous two years, which contained photos taken by himself. It also featured New Zealand scenery captured by photographer Cho Nam-ryong, and contributions from writer Lee Yoon-chul.

In July 2013 he released his debut single in Japan. The title track is a cover of Kōji Tamaki's "Roman," and the single also included Kim's two songs from the Queen Seondeok soundtrack.

In 2022, Kim released CUP vol.1: How Personal Taste Inspires, an interview book collecting the stories of 10 creators about 'Inspiration', the source of creativity.

In September 2022 he opened his personal Instagram account under username @namgildaero.

In November 2022, the agency confirmed that bookings for the autograph donation show '2022 Kim Nam-gil's Universe's Strongest Show from October 31st to October 8th were postponed due to the Seoul Halloween crowd crush.

Filmography

Film

Television series

Web series

Television shows

Music video

Hosting

Theater

Discography

Photo book

Awards and nominations

State honors

Listicles

Notes

References

External links 

 
 
 
 Kim Nam Gil's foundation website
 Kim Nam Gil Japanese Fan Club 
 Kim Nam Gil Instagram Account 

Living people
Male actors from Seoul
South Korean male film actors
South Korean male stage actors
South Korean male television actors
21st-century South Korean male actors
1980 births
Best New Actor Paeksang Arts Award (television) winners